Joshua Gaskill Newbold (May 12, 1830 – June 10, 1903) was the tenth Governor of Iowa.

Early life
Newbold grew up in a Quaker family in Pennsylvania. Later he became a Baptist.  He moved to Iowa in 1854, where he was a farmer.

Civil war service
He joined the Union Army in 1862 as captain of Company C, 25th Regiment of the Iowa Infantry, and fought at the Battle of Chickasaw Bayou, the Battle of Fort Hindman, the Third Battle of Chattanooga, the  Battle of Ringgold Gap, the Atlanta Campaign, and Sherman's March to the Sea.

Postbellum
Newbold served in the Iowa House of Representatives from 1872 to 1876.  He was elected Lieutenant Governor as a Republican in 1876, and succeeded to the governorship when Samuel J. Kirkwood resigned to take a seat in the United States Senate.

From 1899 to 1903, Newbold was mayor of Mount Pleasant, Iowa, where he died and was buried in the Forest Home cemetery in 1903.

References
National Governors Association profile
 Portrait and Biographical Album, 1887, Washington County, Iowa, p. 143
 The United States Biographical Dictionary and Portrait Gallery of Eminent and Self-Made Men, Iowa volume, 1878

1830 births
1903 deaths
Union Army officers
Republican Party members of the Iowa House of Representatives
Lieutenant Governors of Iowa
Republican Party governors of Iowa
Mayors of places in Iowa
Baptists from Pennsylvania
People from Fayette County, Pennsylvania
People from Mount Pleasant, Iowa
People of Iowa in the American Civil War
Baptists from Iowa
Farmers from Iowa
Quakers from Pennsylvania
Former Quakers
19th-century American politicians
20th-century American politicians
19th-century Baptists
Military personnel from Pennsylvania